Ben Judge (born 18 September 1983) is a former Australian professional snooker player, from Perth.

Snooker career
Judge, as an amateur played in a pre-qualifying match for the 2000 World Snooker Championship  losing 5–3 to Atthasit Mahitthi. In 2011, Judge attempted the qualify for the World Snooker Tour via the Q School but was unsuccessful. A year later, Judge won a place on the professional tour for the 2012–13 and 2013–14 seasons after winning the 2012 Oceania Championship, 6–2 over James Mifsud. He had two wins, one against Sam Baird in the Last 96 stage of the 2012 Shanghai Masters qualifiers and the other against Alan McManus in the 2012 Gdynia Open Last 128 stage. He last played in the qualifiers for the 2013 German Masters in November 2012 and resigned from the tour in November 2013.

Judge won two group matches at the 2014 Six-red World Championship to qualify for the last 32, where Stephen Maguire beat him 6–4. He was eliminated in the group stage a year later and was defeated in the wildcard of the 2015 Australian Goldfields Open by Matthew Selt.

Performance and rankings timeline

Notes
A.  Judge resigned from the tour in November 2013, halfway through the 2013–14 season.

References

External links
 Profile on worldsnooker.com
 
 Profile on Pro Snooker Blog

Australian snooker players
Sportsmen from Western Australia
1983 births
Living people
Sportspeople from Perth, Western Australia